is a Japanese ramen noodle restaurant chain headquartered in Kizugawa, Kyoto, Japan.

History
The first restaurant was opened in Nara by Shigeyuki Akasako in 1998. The main restaurant moved to Kyoto in 2003. Muteppou has opened restaurants in Japan and Australia. Butanohone, Gumshara, Shabaton, Mushin, Mukyoku, Museimen are other brands of Muteppou. The restaurants serve a thick pork bone soup. At the main restaurant, 300 kg of pork bones are used a day. The soup is made only from pork bones and water.

Locations

Japan
Kyoto Prefecture (Muteppou)
Osaka Prefecture (Muteppou)
Nara Prefecture (Butanohone, Gumshara, Shabaton, Mushin, Museimen)
Nakano, Tokyo (Muteppou, Gumshara, Mukyoku)

Australia
Sydney (Gumshara)

Ramen dishes

Restaurants

See also
 Ramen shop

References

External links

  

Restaurant chains in Japan
Restaurants in New South Wales
Restaurants established in 1998
Ramen shops